Chora Naga, also known as Coranaga or Mahanaga, was King of Anuradhapura in the 1st century BC, who ruled from 62 BC to 50 BC. He succeeded his cousin Mahakuli Mahatissa as King of Anuradhapura and was succeeded by Kuda Tissa. King Chora Naga was not a follower of the Mahavihara sect. He had even demolished 18 temples that belong to Mahavira. As a result, the author of the Mahāvaṃsa referred to him as a thief.

Death 
The Mahavamsa states that King Chora Naga was poisoned and killed by Anula, his queen consort, who fell in love with a royal guard in the palace called Siva and let him become the ruler of the country. However, there is also a possibility that the people of Anuradhapura, who were frustrated at Chora Naga's mischief, assassinated him.

See also
 List of Sri Lankan monarchs
 History of Sri Lanka

References

External links
 Kings & Rulers of Sri Lanka
 Codrington's Short History of Ceylon

C
C
C
C